Andrew Josiah Piercy (November 1855 – December 27, 1932) was a Major League Baseball infielder.

He was born and died in San Jose, California and was the first California-born player in National League history.

References

External links

1855 births
1932 deaths
Major League Baseball infielders
Chicago White Stockings players
19th-century baseball players
Baseball players from California
San Francisco Eagles players
Oakland Pioneers players
San Francisco Bay City players
San Francisco (minor league baseball) players
San Francisco Californias players
San Francisco Woonsocket players
San Francisco Star players
San Francisco Occidental players
Sacramento Union players